Self-Taught: African American Education in Slavery and Freedom is a book that tells the history of African American self-education from slavery through the Reconstruction Era. It was written by history professor Heather Andrea Williams and published in 2007 by the University of North Carolina Press.

References

External links 

 

2007 non-fiction books
History books about the American Civil War
History books about the United States
Books about African-American history
Non-fiction books about American slavery
University of North Carolina Press books
English-language books
American non-fiction books
Reconstruction Era